Hervé Renaudeau (born 1950's in Laval), is a French professor and aerospace engineer.
From September 2009 to August 2016, he has been the director-general of the Institut polytechnique des sciences avancées (French private aerospace university).

Biography

Graduate from the École centrale de Lyon (promotion 1979), Hervé Renaudeau began his career as a hardware design engineer on the Mirage 2000 autopilot from 1980 to 1981, then as a simulator design engineer for company Crouzet (1981–1984). After that, he worked until 1999 at Digital in Annecy as a project manager, networks and hardware consultant. Business Manager at Atos Origin from 1999 to 2001, he manages Unilog Management, a consulting group, up to 2002. Then, Hervé Renaudeau joined the École supérieure des techniques aéronautiques et de construction automobile at Levallois-Perret, and created the second campus of the university in Laval. In September 2009, he was appointed head of the Institut Polytechnique des Sciences Avancées. He leaves this job in August 2016.

Bibliography
 Académie nationale de l'air et de l'espace and Lucien Robineau, Les français du ciel, dictionnaire historique, Le Cherche midi, June 2005, 782 p.

References

Living people
People from Laval, Mayenne
École Centrale de Lyon alumni
Aviation in France
French aerospace engineers
Heads of universities in France
French academic administrators
1950 births